The Battle of Inverurie may refer to:

The Battle of Inverurie (1308), a battle during the Wars of Scottish Independence
The Battle of Inverurie (1745), a battle during the Jacobite Uprisings in Scotland